David John Pivec (born September 25, 1943) is a former American football tight end in the National Football League and American Football League who played for the Los Angeles Rams and Denver Broncos. He played college football for the Notre Dame Fighting Irish. He also played in the Canadian Football League for the Toronto Argonauts and Ottawa Rough Riders.

References

1943 births
Living people
American football tight ends
Canadian football tight ends
Los Angeles Rams players
Denver Broncos players
Toronto Argonauts players
Ottawa Rough Riders players
Notre Dame Fighting Irish football players